WGAN (560 AM) is an commercial radio station licensed to Portland, Maine.  The station is owned by Saga Communications and it airs a news/talk radio format.  The station calls itself "WGAN Newsradio 98.5 FM and AM 560."  The studios and offices are on Western Avenue in South Portland, Maine.

The station is also heard on a 250-watt FM translator, 98.5 W253DA, which allows listeners who prefer FM radio to hear WGAN in Portland and its close suburbs.  In addition, WGAN is heard on the HD2 channel of co-owned 93.1 WMGX.  AM 560 broadcasts with 5,000 watts around the clock, covering much of Southern Maine and along the Maine Coast up to Rockland.  The transmitter is near the Maine Turnpike off Warren Avenue in Portland.  WGAN is Maine's primary entry point station for the Emergency Alert System.

Programming
WGAN begins each weekday with a local news and interview show, hosted by Matthew Gagnon.  The rest of the weekday schedule is made up of nationally syndicated conservative talk shows from Hugh Hewitt, Grace Curley, Boston-based Howie Carr, Mark Levin, CBS Eye on the World with John Batchelor, Red Eye Radio and This Morning, America's First News with Gordon Deal.

On weekends, there are shows on money, real estate, technology and gardening.  Weekend hosts include Larry Kudlow, Lars Larson, Sebastian Gorka and Rich DeMuro on Tech.  Most hours begin with world and national news from CBS Radio News, followed by Maine news with local reporters.

History

The station was founded in 1938 by Guy Gannett Publishing, which was then the owner of the Portland Press Herald newspaper.  It was Portland's second radio station after 970 WCSH (now co-owned WZAN) which signed on in 1925.  WGAN had its studios in the Columbia Hotel and originally broadcast on 640 kilocycles at 500 watts.  It was a daytimer, required to go off the air at sunset in Los Angeles, because it shared AM 640 with Class I-A KFI, the dominant clear channel station.

WGAN was a CBS Network affiliate, carrying its schedule of dramas, comedies, news, sports, soap operas, game shows and big band broadcasts during the "Golden Age of Radio."  After the enactment of the North American Regional Broadcasting Agreement (NARBA) in 1941, WGAN moved to 560 kHz.  It got a power boost to 5,000 watts and could broadcast around the clock.

In 1954, WGAN gained a companion television station, WGAN-TV 13, and in 1967, a co-owned FM station, 102.9 WGAN-FM (now WBLM).  When network programming moved from radio to television, WGAN began airing a full service, middle of the road format of popular music, news and sports.

Until the early 1980s, Gannett's Portland operations owned the major daily newspaper, the CBS television station, 102.9 WGAN-FM and 560 WGAN, two of the city's top radio stations.  Channel 13 was later renamed WGME when WGAN-AM-FM were sold to Taylor Communications in 1983.  In 1987, WGAN was sold by Taylor to Saga Communications, its present owner.  Saga increased the talk programming and decreased the music shows, eventually evolving WGAN to a full time talk format.

On May 27, 2014, WGAN began simulcasting on FM translator W288CU 105.5 FM, via sister station WMGX's HD2 subchannel.

On August 22, 2019, WGAN also began simulcasting on FM translator W253DA 98.5 FM.   98.5 became WGAN's only translator, with the 105.5 translator switching to an oldies format in the fall.

In March 2020, morning co-host Ken Altshuler was fired, followed in April with weekend morning host John McDonald's termination.  Altshuler had been with WGAN for 18 years, and McDonald for 25.

Translator

References

External links

News and talk radio stations in the United States
GAN
Radio stations established in 1938
1938 establishments in Maine